Caregiver burden is the stress which is perceived by caregivers due to the home care situation.  The subjective burden is considered to be one of the most important predictors of negative outcomes from the home care situation.

Theory 
From a scientific perspective, caregiver burden is a theoretical construct. The conceptual basis for the appraisal of the care situation is the Transactional Model of Lazarus and Folkman.
The subjective evaluation of the care situation (stressor) by the caregivers is critical for the development and maintenance of subjective burden.

According to the Transactional Model, people deal with stressful situations by appraisals of stressor and resources. The primary appraisal deals with the individual meaning of the specific stressor, which is the care situation in this case. The secondary appraisal analyzes the own abilities and resources to cope with that situation. On this basis, the individual coping efforts are used to deal with the stressful situation. As per Carver, these efforts can focus on problem management or emotional regulation. Dysfunctional strategies are possible, too. Studies found that a high caregiver burden often comes along with dysfunctional strategies what means activities which don’t solve the problem but worsen it (e.g. self-criticism, substance abuse).

The (dis)balance between burden/vulnerabilities and resources of the caregiver determines the consequences of a care situation. Home care can result in positive as well as negative experiences.

Regardless of the caregiver burden, relatives can experience benefits - positive consequences - of the home care situation. This may be the feeling of being needed or the knowledge that they have acquired new skills etc.

Triggers for caregiver burden 
Caregiver burden comes out when the caregiver perceives the home care situation as a negative experience. Caregivers are typically not trained. Caring is a serious challenge for them. An intensive adaptation to the care situation is necessary.

The caregiver burden can be based on a variety of aspects of the care situation (e.g. lack of recovery time, challenging behavior of the care requiring person, limitation of social activities and contacts). Studies showed that four aspects are particularly burdensome:
 Care costs much energy
 Desire for recovery
 Too little time for own interests
 Sadness over the fate of the supported person

Meaning of subjective burden 
Negative outcomes are often not determined by the specifics of the caregiving situation itself, but by the reaction and response of the caregiver. The term “caregiver burden” refers to the high level of stress that some caregivers may feel in response to the situation. A study that investigated a variety of factors and their association with caregiver burden in Amyotrophic Lateral Sclerosis (ALS), found that it was more subjective factors (i.e. the caregiver’s quality of life and psychological distress), rather than objective ones (such as the caring situation or the condition of the patient) that were associated to burden. Because the caregiver burden may be felt strongly by one person and not at all by another, regardless of the caregiving situation, it is considered to be subjective and it may be called the “subjective burden”. The subjective burden is considered to be one of the most important predictors of negative outcomes from the home care situation.

Impact on health 
Pinquart and Sörensen (2003) researched the health of caregivers compared to the health of non-caregiving relatives. The researchers found that while caregivers are generally only slightly less physically healthy than non-caregiving relatives, they reported depressive symptoms significantly more often, pointing to a negative effect on their mental health.

This meta-analysis did not consider the impact of subjective burden. In another extensive meta-analysis Pinquart and Sörensen could show that the subjective burden is an important predictor of the health of carers.

Risk of mortality 
Studies found an increased mortality of caregiving spouses. This effect was only found for spouses who felt burdened due to the care situation. Thus, it is not the home care per se that is a risk but the subjective burden.

Without consideration of the caregiver burden, the mortality of caregivers is even slightly reduced compared to non-caregivers.

Caring style 
People who experience caregiver burden can display a wide range of behaviors towards the person in need of care, from loving devotion to abusive behavior (which can manifest as neglect and/or mistreatment). The most common form of abusive behavior is verbal aggression, mainly due to challenging behaviour of the person in need of care. Researchers found that people experiencing caregiver burden are more likely to display abusive behavior and other negative caring styles toward the individuals  they care for than those who are not experiencing caregiver burden.

Ending home care 
The caregiver burden often influences the caregiver’s decision to eventually institutionalize (or, “put someone in a nursing home”. Caregiver burden is particularly associated with the care of people with dementia, meaning that the likelihood of institutionalization is especially heightened in those experiencing caregiver burden who care for people suffering from dementia. In the care of people with dementia, there is consistent evidence: The higher the caregiver burden, the more likely is the institutionalization.

Measuring caregiver burden 
The assessment of caregiver burden enables to judge the situation of the caregiver. The correct measurement of subjective burden is necessary to draw conclusions about the effectiveness of family interventions.

The care situation is an important, highly specific stressor which should be treated with specific interventions. A measurement with general stress-scales is therefore not useful, because in this case the score represents all kind of stress, indiscriminately of its origin. Valid, economic and internationally standardized measurement tools for the specific stressful situation of family caregivers are therefore inevitable.

In Anglo-American countries, a number of burden scales have been developed; e.g. the Burden Interview, the Caregiver Strain Index and the Cost of Care Index. The Burden Scale for Family Caregivers, which has been developed in Germany, is now available in 20 languages.

Burden Scale for Family Caregivers (BSFC) 
The BSFC exists in a detailed version with 28 items, and in a short, more efficient version (BSFC-s) with ten items.

Compared to other burden scales, the BSFC has two benefits. There is a long and a short version, both validated in separate studies. Furthermore, both versions are free in 20 languages, including an introduction on evaluation and interpretation.

Development 
A first, reliable and valid version of the German version was published in 1993. In 2001, the validity was tested and confirmed to a large sample of both dementia and for other causes of care requirement again. In 2003, the English version has been validated. In 2014, the validation study for the short version and an extended validation of the original version have been published.

Scale 
The BSFC consists of 28 items in the detailed or 10 items in the short version. The caregivers have to rate these items on a four-point scale from “strongly agree” to “strongly disagree”.

An evaluation is possible both on item level and on score level. A differentiated detection of the critical aspects of home care is possible with the analysis on item level. The score measures the total burden. This is an important factor to judge the caregiver's situation.

Caregivers´ Daily Issues (CDIs) 
The CDIs deal with 9 main issues of caregivers based on the topical analysis of caregivers' social media communication. A longitudinal analysis of 100 dyads (caregiver vs person with Alzheimer disease) revealed the following structure of issues.

Interventions 
Due to the high importance of the caregiver burden with regard to the care giving process, it is necessary to develop interventions to reduce this burden and to examine their effectiveness. Successful interventions should be available to as many caregivers as possible. "The usefulness of an intervention is the multiplication of effectiveness and usage." (Elmar Gräßel) It is therefore necessary both to develop interventions and to improve and to find ways to strengthen the awareness and use of these interventions.

Interventions and services
Unburdening interventions for caregivers should consider four central aspects:
 Information and training
 Professional support
 Effective communication
 Public and financial support
There are different supporting services, e.g. caregiver counselling, professional training, self-help groups, ambulant nursing services or technical help like intelligent light to preserve the autonomy of the person in need of care.

Another effective relief is the support given to caregivers by family members, friends and acquaintances. They provide emotional and instrumental support and are an important source to access supporting services.

A 2021 Cochrane review found that remotely delivered interventions including support, training and information may reduce the burden for the informal caregiver and improve their depressive symptoms. However, there is no certain evidence that they improve health-related quality of life. The findings are based on moderate certainty evidence from 26 studies.

Implications to strengthen and develop the informal caregiving
 Services should be made better known.
 The regional availability of support services should be made increased.
 Case management services should increase the effectivity of unburdening concepts.
 Public financial support should be made more available.
 The basic conditions of caregiving should allow the combination of care and occupation.
 Job conditions should be developed. No disadvantages should arise for caregivers who restrict the scope of their employment or temporarily give it up completely.
 Language barriers should be reduced. Low-threshold offers in information, counselling and support should be intercultural orientated.
 Internet based support should be extended.
 There is a lack of qualitative empirical studies on the impact of unburdening interventions. Evidence based health services research should focus on that point.

References 

Caregiving
Nursing
Psychological stress